Kristina Bedeč (also transliterated Kristina Bedec, also transliterated Krisztina Bedoecs; born 20 November 1986) is a Serbian sprint canoer. After representing her country of birth, Hungary, she briefly competed for Austria, and since 2013 she is representing Serbia.

Her biggest successes in canoe sprint are winning the gold medal in women's K-1 1000 m at the 2016 Canoe Sprint European Championships and silver medal in the same discipline at the 2015 Canoe Sprint World Championships.

More recently, in canoe marathon she has won a silver medal at the Canoe Marathon World Championships in 2019 and gold (and bronze) medal at the Canoe Marathon European Championships in 2021.

References

1986 births
Living people
Sportspeople from Győr
Serbian female canoeists
Hungarian female canoeists
Austrian female canoeists
Naturalized citizens of Serbia
ICF Canoe Sprint World Championships medalists in kayak
Medalists at the ICF Canoe Marathon World Championships
European champions for Serbia